John Albert Rowan (1886-1966) was a Major League Baseball pitcher. When he wasn't pitching in the majors, Rowan played for the Dayton Veterans of the Central League in 1908 and from 1912 until 1917.

External links

Major League Baseball pitchers
Detroit Tigers players
Cincinnati Reds players
Philadelphia Phillies players
Chicago Cubs players
Leavenworth Old Soldiers players
Atlanta Crackers players
Macon Brigands players
Dayton Veterans players
Baseball players from Pennsylvania
1886 births
1966 deaths